The National Party for Development and Welfare is a minor political party in Libya, represented in the General National Congress. It was founded in 2012 by Ali Zeidan, the country's first Prime Minister under the title State of Libya.

References 

2012 establishments in Libya
Liberal parties in Libya
Political parties established in 2012
Political parties in Libya